The Australian Rheumatology Association is an association of rheumatologists in Australia. It is a specialty society of the Royal Australasian College of Physicians and a member of the Asia Pacific League of Associations for Rheumatology.

External links

Rheumatology organizations
Health care industry trade groups based in Australia